This is a list of tennis players who have represented the Great Britain Davis Cup team in an official Davis Cup match. Great Britain have taken part in the competition since 1900.

Players
Last updated after the 2019 Davis Cup.

References

Lists of Davis Cup tennis players
Davis
Davis Cup team representatives